C2D may refer to:
 Intel Core 2 Duo, a microprocessor line by Intel
 Crash to desktop, in computing, an event where a program exits abnormally